The 2019 Tour of Oman was a road cycling stage race that took place in Oman between 16 and 21 February 2019. It was the tenth edition of the Tour of Oman, and was rated as a 2.HC event as part of the UCI Asia Tour.

Alexey Lutsenko defended his title from last year as he won with his  team as he also took home the point classification.

Teams
Eighteen teams were invited to start the race. These included seven UCI WorldTeams and 11 UCI Professional Continental teams. Each team had a maximum of seven riders:

Schedule

Stages

Stage 1

Stage 2

Stage 3

Stage 4

Stage 5

Stage 6

Final standings

References

External links

2019 UCI Asia Tour
2019 in Omani sport
Tour of Oman
Tour of Oman